OJSC Mytishchi Machine-Building Plant is a Russian manufacturer of dump trucks and armored tracked vehicles. The plant was formerly part of Metrowagonmash, from which it was spun off in 2009. As of 2016, it is managed by Kalashnikov Concern.

OSJC Mytishchi Machine-Building Plant has produced air defense vehicles for the military and has a design bureau for development of these weapons. It also makes products for the civilian automotive industry.

The factory was a major supplier of anti-aircraft materiel for the Soviet Union in World War II.

Products
 ASU-57
 ASU-85
 GM chassis
 ZSU-23-4
 ZSU-37

References

External links
 Official website

Vehicle manufacturing companies established in 2009
Defence companies of Russia
Companies based in Moscow Oblast
Russian companies established in 2009
Kalashnikov Concern
Design bureaus